The 103rd Field Artillery Regiment (103rd FAR) is a regiment of the United States Army.  The only currently existing component is the 1st Battalion, 103rd Field Artillery Regiment (1-103rd FAR), a unit of the Rhode Island National Guard.  The regiment was originally constituted in 1917, but it descends from predecessor units dating back to 1801.

Predecessor units (1801 to 1917)

Providence Marine Corps of Artillery

The 103d Field Artillery Regiment traces its origins to the Providence Marine Corps of Artillery (PMCA). (Despite the similarity of their names, the PMCA has no connection with the United States Marine Corps.) The PMCA was originally organized in 1801 by the Providence Marine Society (founded in 1798). The PMCA's original purpose was to provide trained gun crews to merchant ships based in Providence, Rhode Island, which had been threatened by the French during the Quasi War (1798–1800) as well as the increasing menace of the Barbary pirates in the Mediterranean Sea. The PMCA's first commanding officer was Lieutenant Colonel Commandant Seth Wheaton (1759–1827), who had served as a lieutenant in the Rhode Island Militia during the American Revolution.

With the pacification of the Barbary states, the PMCA continued as a chartered command of the Rhode Island Militia. As a chartered command, it had the privilege of electing its own officers and was subject only to the authority of the Governor of Rhode Island – as it was not part of the "regular" militia structure of the state – rather than the senior officers of the state militia. Its membership consisted of leading citizens of Providence and was, thereby, considered an "elite" military unit.

About 1850, the PMCA acquired the use of a castle-style armory, which is known as the Benefit Street Arsenal, from the Providence Light Infantry. The arsenal, completed in 1839, still serves as the headquarters of the PMCA and holds a large collection of military artifacts ranging from the Civil War to the Second World War. The arsenal is listed on the National Register of Historic Places.

American Civil War
During the American Civil War, the PMCA was activated twice. The first time was at the outbreak of the war when it served from April 18 to August 1, 1861, as the 1st Rhode Island Battery under the command of Captain Charles H. Tompkins. The unit was armed with 14-pounder James rifles at the First Battle of Bull Run near Manassas, Virginia, where weapons of this type are emplaced as of 2015 in the Manassas National Battlefield Park to commemorate the battery's service.

The second time was from May to August 1862, when it served as the 10th Rhode Island Battery under the command of Captain Edwin C. Gallup. The 10th Battery was deployed, along with the 9th and 10th Rhode Island Infantry regiments, to defend Washington, D.C. The battery moved to Washington, D.C., May 27–29, 1862, and was attached to Whipple's Command, Military District of Washington. Served duty at Camp Frieze, Tennallytown, until June 23. At Cloud's Mills until June 30, and then near Fort Pennsylvania until August when the battery returned to Rhode Island and was mustered out of service August 30, 1862.

The Benefit Street Arsenal not only served as the mobilization site for the PMCA but, also, for all eight batteries of the 1st Rhode Island Light Artillery Regiment, which was organized in 1861. As a result, the PMCA is considered the "Mother of the Rhode Island Batteries" – as is stated on a plaque affixed to the Benefit Street Arsenal.

As a result of desiring a veteran's organization under their own authority, veteran members of the PMCA formed the Veteran Association PMCA. This association, composed of past and honorary members of the Providence Marine Corps of Artillery, was organized on January 21, 1874. Its object was to "afford occasional opportunities to revive pleasant memories of the past, to unite in sympathy graduates separated by many years, and to secure for the active corps the benefit of their interest, influence, and strength". A large number of leading citizens of Rhode Island were members of the Veteran Association – including governors William Sprague, Henry Lippitt and Elisha Dyer Jr. The Veteran Association continues to exist as a private organization and is the de facto veterans association for the 103d Field Artillery Regiment.

Light Battery A
On April 19, 1875, the PMCA voted to make itself subject to the state militia laws and, on May 1, 1875, the PMCA was re-designated as Light Battery A of the 1st Artillery Battalion of the Rhode Island Militia. The other unit of the battalion was designated as Light Battery B.  Battery B and the battalion were disbanded in 1879 when Light Battery A continued as a separate unit within the Rhode Island Militia.

Battery A was mobilized on June 25, 1898, for service in the Spanish–American War under the command of Captain Edgar R. Barker. The battery did not serve overseas but was stationed at the Quonset Point militia training camp in North Kingstown, Rhode Island. It was mustered out of service on October 26, 1898.

Battery A became part of the Rhode Island National Guard when the Guard was organized from units of the Rhode Island Militia in 1907. The National Guard was created by the Militia Act of 1903 which provided federal funding for state militia units in exchange for the units being trained and equipped to federal standards. While some militia units declined to be governed by federal regulations, Battery A, along with most of the other Rhode Island Militia units, chose to become part of the National Guard.

First World War (1917 to 1919)
Light Battery A was expanded on June 15, 1917, to form the 1st Separate Battalion, Rhode Island Field Artillery. It was mustered into active service on July 25, 1917, at Quonset Point and drafted into federal service August 5, 1917. The unit was reorganized and redesignated on August 20, 1917, as the 1st Battalion of the newly formed 103d Field Artillery Regiment, an element of the 26th Division. The 26th Division, nicknamed the "Yankee Division", was formed from National Guard units of all six New England states.

The 103d Field Artillery Regiment consisted of two battalions of three batteries each. It served with the 101st and 102d Field Artillery Regiments in the 51st Field Artillery Brigade of the 26th Division. Along with the rest of the 26th Division, the 103d was shipped to France in late 1917. Overseas, the regiment participated in six campaigns prior to the Armistice on November 11, 1918. The six campaigns were: Champagne-Marne, Aisne-Marne, St. Mihiel, Meuse-Argonne, Ile de France and Lorraine.

Interwar period (1919 to 1941)
The 103d was demobilized, along with the 26th Division, on April 29, 1919, at Camp Devens, Massachusetts. It was reorganized between April and November 1921 in the Rhode Island National Guard at Providence, Rhode Island, as the 1st Battalion, Field Artillery, with the headquarters being federally recognized on 17 November 1921 at Providence.

The 1st Battalion was redesignated on November 25. 1921 as the 1st Battalion, 103d Field Artillery (1st/103d FA), an element of the 43rd Infantry Division, a newly formed National Guard division with units from Rhode Island, Connecticut, Maine, and Vermont.

The regiment was consolidated on January 2, 1930, with the 2d Squadron, 122nd Cavalry Regiment which became the 2nd Battalion, 103d Field Artillery (2nd/103d FA) and the consolidated unit was reorganized and redesignated as the 103d Field Artillery, with headquarters at Providence.

During the interwar period the 103d was activated by order of the Governor of Rhode Island for the following state emergencies:
 Strike duty, Pawtuxet, February 20 to October 14, 1922
 Strike duty, Manville, August 31 to September 3, 1926
 Textile workers strike, Saylesville and Bristol, September 10–14, 1934
 Flood relief, Pawtuxet River, March 19–20, 1936
 Flood relief, Norwood, July 24–26, 1938
 1938 Hurricane, September 21–25, 1938

World War II (1941–1945)
The 103d was inducted into federal service, as a unit of the 43rd Infantry Division, on 24 February 1941 at home stations and was ordered to Camp Blanding, Florida. The 103d Field Artillery Regiment was broken up on 19 February 1942 and its elements reorganized and redesignated as follows: 1st and 2d Battalions as the 103d and 169th Field Artillery Battalions, respectively, elements of the 43d Infantry Division; the Regimental Headquarters was disbanded at this time.

During the Second World War, the 103d and 169th Field Artillery Battalions served with the 43rd Infantry Division in the Pacific Theater. Both units earned campaign credit for service in the New Guinea, Northern Solomons, and Luzon campaigns. Additionally, the 169th Field Artillery Battalion earned credit for the Guadalcanal campaign.

Captain Elwood Joseph Euart of the regiment was the only member of the 103rd lost in the sinking of the U.S. Army transport USAT President Coolidge on October 26, 1942.  Captain Euart had safely got off President Coolidge when he heard that there were still men in the infirmary who could not get out. He returned through one of the sea doors, successfully rescued the men but was then unable to escape himself and went down with the ship. He was posthumously awarded the Distinguished Service Cross for his heroic actions.

The 43d Division was located in the Philippines at the time of the Japanese surrender on September 2, 1945.

Post–World War II (1945 to 2001)
The 103d Field Artillery Battalion was inactivated on October 22, 1945, at Camp Stoneman, California. It was reorganized and federally recognized in the Rhode Island National Guard on 15 October 1946 with headquarters at Providence.

The 169th Field Artillery Battalion was inactivated on 22 October 1945 at Camp Stoneman, California. On 21 May 21, 1946, it was relieved from assignment to the 43d Infantry Division. Reorganized and federally recognized 19 January 1948 with headquarters at Providence. Reorganized and redesignated 1 March 1949 as the 169th Antiaircraft Artillery Automatic Weapons Battalion and assigned to the 43d Infantry Division.

Shortly after the outbreak of the Korean War, in June 1950, the 103d and 169th battalions, as units of the 43d Infantry Division, were ordered into active federal service September 5, 1950, and spent three years in Germany replacing Regular Army units which had been sent to fight in Korea. The 43d Infantry Division was demobilized shortly after the armistice was signed in July 1953.

The 103d Field Artillery Battalion and the 169th Antiaircraft Artillery Battalion were consolidated April 1, 1959, with Headquarters, 103d Field Artillery (concurrently reconstituted in the Rhode Island Army National Guard) to form the 103d Artillery, a parent regiment under the Combat Arms Regimental System, to consist of the 1st Rocket Howitzer Battalion and the 2d, 3d, and 4th Howitzer Battalions, elements of the 43d Infantry Division. The 103d FA Battalion was re-designated as 1st Battalion, 103d Artillery Regiment (1st/103d) on June 19, 1961.

The 103d Artillery Regiment was reorganized 18 March 1963 to consist of the 1st, 2d, and 3d Howitzer Battalions. Reorganized on January 1, 1965, to consist of the 1st, 2d, and 3d Howitzer Battalions and Battery F. Reorganized  March 1, 1966, to consist of the 1st, 2d, and 3d Howitzer Battalions.

The 43d Infantry Division was disbanded on December 16, 1967, and its units were assigned to other organizations.  The 103d Artillery was reorganized on February 1, 1968, to consist of the 1st and 2d Battalions.

The 103d Artillery Regiment was redesignated on 1 March 1972 as the 103d Field Artillery Regiment.

In February 1978 the 103d Field Artillery was mobilized, along with the entire Rhode Island National Guard, to provide emergency service in response to the Great Blizzard of 1978, which paralyzed the state with over 3 feet of snow.

In May 1968 the Headquarters and Headquarters Battery of the XLIII Corps Artillery was redesignated as the Headquarters and Headquarters Battery of the 103d Field Artillery Group to provide commanded and control of the 1st/103d and the 2nd/103d. The 103d FA Brigade also had operational control of three other field artillery battalions under the CAPSTONE program which integrated Regular Army, Army Reserve, and National Guard units.   In October 1979 the 103d Field Artillery Group was redesignated as the 103d Field Artillery Brigade.  While the 103d FA Brigade shared the same numerical designation as the 103d FA Regiment, it did not share the same lineage and honors as it was a newly created unit.

As of 1984 the 1st and 2nd Battalions were part of the 103rd Field Artillery Brigade, headquartered at Providence, both equipped with 155-mm towed artillery pieces.

The 2d Battalion, 103d Field Artillery Regiment was inactivated in April 1990. The 1-103d remained under the 103d Field Artillery Brigade. In the late 1990s the Cranston Street Armory in Providence was closed and the headquarters of the 103d Field Artillery Brigade, as well as the Headquarters Battery, Battery A, and Service Battery of the 1st-103d, were relocated to the Armory of Mounted Commands on North Main Street in Providence. Battery B of the 1-103d was located at a former Nike missile site in North Smithfield and Battery C was located in Bristol adjacent to the Rhode Island Veterans Home.

Recent conflicts (2001 to present)
Elements of the 1st Battalion, 103d Field Artillery Regiment were mobilized for service in Iraq and Kuwait during Operation Iraqi Freedom. From January 2004 to April 2005 batteries A and B of the 1-103d served on active duty and supported combat operation in Iraq for nearly 13 of the 15-month mobilization. On December 3, 2014, Battery A (Forward) was awarded the Meritorious Unit Commendation along with the 1st Battalion, 206th Field Artillery Regiment for meritorious service during the deployment.

Headquarters and Headquarters Battery of the 103d Field Artillery Brigade was mobilized in August 2004, was sent to Iraq, and served until August 2005. C Battery, 1-103d deployed to Iraq from September 2007 to September 2008.

The Headquarters of the 103d Field Artillery Brigade was inactivated on September 6, 2008. As a result, the 1st Battalion, 103d Field Artillery was reassigned to the 197th Field Artillery Brigade (New Hampshire Army National Guard) in its operational chain of command and to the 43rd Military Police Brigade (Rhode Island Army National Guard) in its administrative chain of command.  At the same time as the inactivation of the 103d Field Artillery Brigade, the 1207th Transportation Company and the 1043d Maintenance Company were consolidated to form the 1207th Forward Support Company (FSC) to provide logistical and maintenance support to 1st Battalion, 103d Field Artillery.

As of 2020, 1st Battalion, 103d Field Artillery continues to serve in the Rhode Island National Guard. The 1st BN 103d FA consists of five units: Headquarters and Headquarters Battery, Batteries A, B and C (C Btry re-stationed to NH Army National Guard in 2019), and the 1207th Forward Support Company (FSC).

Veterans association
In the post World War II era, the name "Providence Marine Corps of Artillery" has been used by a private non-profit entity that functions as the de facto veterans association of the 103d Field Artillery.  (Its membership is primarily current and former members of the 103d Field Artillery with a select group of other individuals.)  It holds a long term lease on the historic Benefit Street Arsenal which houses numerous artifacts that commemorate the history of the 103d Field Artillery.  The arsenal is also used for meetings of Elisha Dyer Camp 7 of the Sons of Union Veterans of the Civil War (SUVCW) and the annual encampment of the Rhode Island Department of the SUVCW.

Notable members
 Brigadier General Harold R. Barker - artillery commander of the 43rd Infantry Division.
 Colonel Howard F. Brown
 Major General William C. Chase - Commander of the 1st Cavalry Division.
 Brigadier General Elisha Dyer Jr. – Adjutant General and Governor of Rhode Island.
 Brigadier General Pelham D. Glassford - Commander during World War I.
 Lieutenant Colonel Frederick Lippitt – Commander of 103d Field Artillery Battalion from 1953–1963, public servant and philanthropist.
 Colonel Henry Lippitt – Governor of Rhode Island.
 Major General James W. Nuttall
 Colonel John A. Twachtman – Commanded regiment during World War I.
 Brigadier General Richard Valente

Heraldry

Coat of arms

Distinctive unit insignia

See also
State Arsenal (Providence, Rhode Island)

References
Notes

Bibliography
McKenney, Janice E. (1985) Field artillery Part 2, Army Lineage Series.  Washington DC: United States Army Center for Military History

External links
1st Battalion, 103rd Field Artillery, Rhode Island National Guard
 

Field artillery regiments of the United States Army
Field artillery regiments of the United States Army National Guard
F 103
Military units and formations in Rhode Island
Military units and formations established in 1917